Soulsmith is a 2017 Irish film, directed, written and produced by Kevin Henry.

Production
€2,176 was raised via an Indiegogo campaign. Soulsmith was filmed in Castlebar and Dublin. It was filmed in 2.35:1. Kevin Henry said that "When writing Soulsmith, so much coverage on my generation had been about emigration but I just wanted to focus on those who stayed. And in a more focused sense, Soulsmith tries to take a step back and look at masculinity within my generation."

Plot
Ed Smith is a once-successful playwright now struggling. Then, his father dies, and he goes home to County Mayo.

Reception
The film was shown at the 2017 Cork Film Festival. It won the Best International Feature award at the Austin Revolution Film Festival. It was shown at the Irish Film Institute and received its TV premiere on RTÉ One on 21 December 2018.

On Scannain.com, Dave Higgins gave it 4.0/5, saying "Soulsmith is a movie brimming over with the passion the director clearly has for the story and it’s full of wonderful characters and clever writing."

References

External links

Facebook page

2017 films
Films set in Ireland
Irish drama films
Films about playwrights
2017 drama films
2010s English-language films
Films shot in County Mayo
Films shot in Dublin (city)
English-language Irish films